Hwang Gyu-beom (born 30 August 1989) is a South Korean footballer who plays as defender for Goyang Hi FC in K League Challenge.

Career
He joined Korea National League side Ansan Hallelujah in 2008. Hwang made his professional debut in the 2013 K League Challenge match on 27 April 2013 after the team joined the professional second division in 2013.

References

External links 

1989 births
Living people
Association football defenders
South Korean footballers
Goyang Zaicro FC players
Korea National League players
K League 2 players
Place of birth missing (living people)
Sangji University alumni